Lobček is a settlement southeast of Grosuplje in central Slovenia. The Municipality of Grosuplje is part of the historical region of Lower Carniola and is now included in the Central Slovenia Statistical Region.

History
Lobček was formerly a hamlet divided between Veliko Mlačevo, Zagradec pri Grosupljem, and Žalna. It was formally separated from these settlements in 1983 and made an independent settlement.

References

External links

Lobček on Geopedia

Populated places in the Municipality of Grosuplje